Kotovskoye is a rural locality (selo) in the Rasskazovsky District of Tambov Oblast, Russia.

Name 
Before the name was changed to Kotovskoye, it was named the Russian Ganchesty.

In the 1950s, the village was given its present name in honor of Grigory Kotovsky, a prominent Soviet military leader and communist activist.

History 
The village was founded in 1744 as Kobylenka.  According to the Second Audit of 1744, the village was settled by the migrants from nearby Koptevo and Zderevaya.  According to the Audit, the village population was 152.

Kotovskoye developed when multiple Jews immigrated to Bessarabia (see History of the Jews in Bessarabia).

Demographics

Jew population 
In 1925, 203 Jews were merchants, 94 were artisans, and 21 were farmers.

During the Holocaust, the Jew population was killed when Nazi German forces went through the area.

Population by year

References

Sources

Rural localities in Tambov Oblast
Populated places established in 1744
1744 establishments in the Russian Empire